Z road may refer to :
County road Z, in the US, may refer to :
One of many county roads named "Z" in Wisconsin
a road in Conejos/Costilla County, Colorado crossing the Rio Grande